The Epistle of Ignatius to the Ephesians (often abbreviated Ign. Eph.) is an epistle attributed to Ignatius of Antioch, a second-century bishop of Antioch, and addressed to the church in Ephesus of Asia Minor. It was written during Ignatius' transport from Antioch to his execution in Rome.

Composition

To the Ephesians is one of seven epistles attributed to Ignatius that are generally accepted as authentic. In 5th century, this collection was enlarged by spurious letters.

It is clear that To the Ephesians was written soon before the martyrdom of Ignatius, but it is uncertain when precisely this martyrdom occurred. Tradition places the martyrdom of Ignatius in the reign of Trajan, who was emperor of Rome from 98 to 117 AD. While many scholars accept the traditional dating of Ignatius' martyrdom under Trajan, others have argued for a somewhat later date. Richard Pervo dated Ignatius' death to 135-140 AD, and British classicist Timothy Barnes has argued for a date some time in the 140s AD.

Content
Ignatius opens his letter by praising the Ephesians and highly commends Onesimus stating: I received, therefore, your whole multitude in the name of God, through Onesimus, a man of inexpressible love, and your bishop in the flesh, whom I pray you by Jesus Christ to love, and that you would all seek to be like him. ... And indeed Onesimus himself greatly commends your good order in God, that ye all live according to the truth, and that no sect has any dwelling-place among you. This could well be the same Onesimus that Paul writes about in the canonical Epistle to Philemon. 
Ignatius advises the Ephesians that they should revere and obey their bishop as if he were Christ himself
 
. Ignatius seems to reiterate the topic of unity as this was one of Paul's main topic in the epistle to the Ephesians. 
Ignatius references a tradition which is either not explicitly mentioned in the canonical gospel texts or is expanded on here:

This story of a spectacular celestial light bears some similarities to the nativity story found in the Gospel of Matthew.

References

2nd-century Christian texts
Apocryphal epistles
Letters (message)
Works by the Church Fathers